Chakradhari is a 1977 Telugu-language biographical film, based on the life of the potter-turned-saint Gora Kumbhar. produced by N. R. Anuradha Devi under the Lakshmi Films Combines banner and directed by V. Madhusudhana Rao. The film stars Akkineni Nageswara Rao and Vanisri, with music composed by G. K. Venkatesh. It is a remake of the 1974 Kannada film Bhakta Kumbara. G.K.Venkatesh, who had composed music for the Kannada version, was chosen as the music director of this movie. 4 songs were retained from the original version.

Plot
The film is based on the story of Gora Kumbhar an advent devotee of Lord Panduranga between the 11th to 12th centuries belonging to Satyapuri village Maharashtra. The film begins, with Namadeva a great disciple of Lord Panduranga (Ramakrishna) offering Prasāda to which he does not respond when saint Gynadev (Nagaraju) explains that the Lord may visit some other devotee. At that moment, self-centered Namadeva declares there is no other devotee superior to him. Now the story twists to Gora (Akkineni Nageswara Rao) a potter, who leads a happy family life with his ideal wife Lakshmi (Vanisri) and a kid Vittu. Gora is very kindhearted and ameliorates everyone in the village. However, he is not interested in worldly matters and is always immersed in the adoration of Lord Panduranga. Once, Namadeva & Gynadeva in their tour halts at Satyapuri where Gora provides hospitality. Here Gynadeva orders Gora to acknowledge the state of knowledge from the disciples when Gora affirms Namadeva as a half-knowledge fellow. Knowing it, Namadeva seeks the Lord to endorse his duty when the Lord states to search for a mentor to amend his deficiency and he moves. Meanwhile, in an awful incident, Gora while mixing clay gets involved with a devotional ecstasy and plods the child under the mud. Due to this, furious Lakshmi takes a vow in the name of the Lord that Gora should not touch her. There onwards, Gora works on his own which suffers Lakshmi. So, she performs remarriage to him with her sister Manju (Jaya Prada) when Lakshmi's father (Gummadi) takes a promise from Gora to treat both of his wives similarly. Right now, Gora refuses to touch Manju also, but one night, unfortunately, he touches them when dies out of contrition as he committed a great sin. So, he amputates his hands when Panduranga appears in the form of a potter Ranganna and starts serving him. During that time, Namadeva realizes Gora is his mentor, bows his head down, and also makes known that Ranganna is none other than Panduranga. At last, the Lord completes his test of Gora, restores his hands, and gives back his child alive. Finally, it is proclaimed that Gora's name will be immortal as one of the great devotees of Lord Panduranga.

Cast
Akkineni Nageswara Rao as Gora Kumbhar / Gora
Vanisri as Lakshmi
Jaya Prada as Manju
Satyanarayana as Namadeva
Ramakrishna as Lord Panduranga / Ranganna
Gummadi as Lakshmi's father 
Allu Ramalingaiah as Sangoji
Rajababu as Devada
Mukkamala as Saint
Nagaraju as Gynadeva
Mada as Basavanna
Vennira Aadai Nirmala as Rukmini
Rama Prabha as Tulasamma
Jaya Malini as item number

Soundtrack

Music was composed by G. K. Venkatesh who was also the composer of the Kannada version. Four songs were retained from the original Kannada versions whereas another song was based on a Kannada song from Bangaarada Manushya movie composed by the same music director.

Other versions
The story of Gora Kumbhar has been an inspiration for various movies and has had various versions in Indian film industry.

References

External links

Indian biographical films
Hindu devotional films
Films directed by V. Madhusudhana Rao
Films scored by G. K. Venkatesh
Films set in the 13th century
Films set in the 14th century
Telugu remakes of Kannada films
1970s biographical films